Alexandre Imbeault (born June 25, 1986) is a Canadian professional ice hockey player who is currently playing for the Orlando Solar Bears of the ECHL.

Career
After a four-year stint in the QMJHL, Imbeault turned professional in 2007 with the Johnstown Chiefs of the ECHL. Despite only playing fifty-six of a possible seventy-two games, Imbeault finished the season with the team lead in goals (26) and finished second in points with sixty-two points.  Imbeault also split time with the Providence Bruins of the American Hockey League, scoring seven points in twelve games during the 2007-08 AHL season.

Imbeault joined the Alaska Aces during the 2008-09 ECHL season, where he continued his role as one of the team's leading goal scorers. He finished tied for third with twenty goals and was one of the team's top scorers during the playoffs. Imbeault finished the post-season with nineteen points in twenty games as the Aces reached the Finals, but lost to the South Carolina Stingrays in a seven-game series.

From 2010 to 2012, Imbeault played in several leagues, ranging from Canada, Czech Republic, Norway, along with several stops in the AHL and the ECHL.

Imbeault started the 2012–13 season with the Ljubljana Olimpija HK in Austria, but after three games he was released on September 17, 2012. About two weeks later, Imbeault was signed by the Orlando Solar Bears on September 30, 2012.

Awards and accomplishments
2007–08: ECHL Player Of The Week (February 25 – March 2, 2008)
2007–08: Leading goal scorer, Johnstown Chiefs (26)
2011–12: GET-ligaen playoff champion, Stavanger Oilers

References

External links

1986 births
Living people
Alaska Aces (ECHL) players
Canadian ice hockey centres
Canadian people of French descent
Chicoutimi Saguenéens (QMJHL) players
Connecticut Whale (AHL) players
Florida Everblades players
French Quebecers
Hartford Wolf Pack players
HC Slavia Praha players
HDD Olimpija Ljubljana players
Johnstown Chiefs players
Peoria Rivermen (AHL) players
Providence Bruins players
Quebec Remparts players
Ice hockey people from Montreal
Victoriaville Tigres players
Orlando Solar Bears (ECHL) players
Canadian expatriate ice hockey players in the Czech Republic
Canadian expatriate ice hockey players in Slovenia
Canadian expatriate ice hockey players in the United States
Stavanger Oilers players
Canadian expatriate ice hockey players in Norway